Association football is among the most popular sports in Europe, with fourteen members of the UEFA having competed at the sport's biggest international event, the FIFA Women's World Cup. The highest ranked result in the Women's World Cup for a European team is 1st place in the 1995, 2003 and 2007 FIFA Women's World Cups by Germany and Norway.

Overview

Results

Most finishes in the top four

Team results by tournament
Legend

 — Champions
 — Runners-up
 — Third place
 — Fourth place
QF — Quarter-finals
R2 — Round 2
R1 — Round 1

Q — Qualified for upcoming tournament
TBD — To be determined (may still qualify for upcoming tournament)
 — Qualified but withdrew
 — Did not qualify
 — Did not enter / Withdrew / Banned
 — Hosts
 — Not affiliated in FIFA

The team ranking in each tournament is according to FIFA. The rankings, apart from the top four positions, are not a result of direct competition between the teams; instead, teams eliminated in the same round are ranked by their full results in the tournament. In recent tournaments, FIFA has used the rankings for seedings for the final tournament draw.

For each tournament, the number of teams in each finals tournament (in brackets) are shown.

Tournament standings

Overall team records
As per statistical convention in football, matches decided in extra time are counted as wins and losses, while matches decided by penalty shoot-outs are counted as draws. 3 points per win, 1 point per draw and 0 points per loss.

Results through 2019 FIFA Women's World Cup

Appearances

Ranking of teams by number of appearances

Team debuts

Summary of performance
This table shows the number of countries represented at the Women's World Cup, the number of entries (#E) from around the world including any rejections and withdrawals, the number of European entries (#A), how many of those European entries withdrawn (#A-) before/during qualification or were rejected by FIFA, the European representatives at the Women's World Cup finals, the number of World Cup Qualifiers each European representative had to play to get to the World Cup (#WCQ), the furthest stage reached, results, and coaches.

Not yet qualified
41 of the 55 active FIFA and UEFA members have never appeared in the final tournament.

Legend
 TBD — To be determined (may still qualify for upcoming tournament)
 — Did not qualify
 — Did not enter / Withdrew / Banned
 — Not affiliated in FIFA
 — Qualified, but withdrew before Finals

Notes:
1Part of 
3Part of 
4Not a member of UEFA

Competitive history

1991: early European domination
The UEFA Women's Euro 1991, which served as the direct qualification tickets for the 1991 FIFA Women's World Cup in China, saw Germany, Italy, Norway and Denmark represented Europe, while Sweden was the lucky loser to join the tournament as well, having failed to qualify for the tournament but achieved the best records among the playoff losers. In just the first World Cup season, Europe immediately demonstrated its women's football quality no less inferior than the men's counterparts. Denmark and Italy reached the quarter-finals, where their journey ended in the quarter-finals to the hand of Germany and Norway. Both Germany and Norway, together with Sweden, went on to finish among top 4; the Germans lost to the United States 2–5 in the quarter-finals, while Norway overcame fellow European opponent Sweden 4–1. Sweden went to take third place by beating Germany 4–0 while Norway lost 1–2 to the United States, missing the opportunity to bring home first Women's World Cup title.

1995: first European triumph and England's debut
The UEFA Women's Euro 1995, played with the same format of qualifying like 1991, saw Denmark, Norway, England and Germany joined the 1995 World Cup tournament held in Sweden, with Denmark being the lucky loser to qualify. Europe once again proved domination, and this time, was far more successful, with Denmark, England and hosts Sweden reached the last eight, where they lost to Norway, Germany and China in process. Norway and Germany moved on to reach the final, where the Norwegians corrected the failure of 1991 final by winning 2–0, making it the first major FIFA triumph for the Nordic side.

1999: Italy's return, Russia's debut, and less success
After the impressive displays of European sides in the first two editions, the 1999 tournament in the United States saw Europe organised the first ever separate qualification instead of using the continental tournament like the other confederations. With the new qualification system, Italy returned after missing the 1995 edition, while Russia debuted, joining with Germany, Sweden, Norway and Denmark as well. The tournament proved to be a sour note for Europe, with Denmark and Italy became the first European teams to fail to progress from the group stage, with Denmark the worst-performed team with one goal scored and no point. Russia, Sweden and Germany could not do better when reaching the last eight, losing to China, Norway and the United States, respectively. Norway, then-world champions, suffered an agonising 0–5 loss to China in the semi-finals, thus failed to defend the title, yet Norway could not even win an honourable medal after losing to Brazil on penalty for third place.

2003: beginning of German domination
The 2003 qualification saw Italy and Denmark, two worst-performed teams from Europe back in 1999, failed to qualify for the 2003 edition, also hosted in the United States. France became the debutant in the tournament, joining Russia, Sweden, Germany and Norway.

After the disappointing 1999 show, Europe reclaimed its prestige in 2003 in style. With the exception of France, the other four progressed to the knockout phase: Russia were crushed 1–7 by Germany, Sweden beat Brazil 2–1 while Norway fell 0–1 to the American hosts. Subsequently, Germany and Sweden overcame North American representatives the United States and Canada to make the all-out second European final, where Germany triumphed 2–1 after an extra-time golden goal, to give Germany the first Women's World Cup title. By doing so, Germany became the first, and so far, the only country in the world to win both men's and women's World Cup.

2007: Germany at peak, England and Denmark's return
The 2007 qualification witnessed England and Denmark returned to the tournament, with England qualified after missing two previous editions, while Denmark returned after missing 2003, joining old forces Germany, Norway and Sweden.

The tournament was a major success for Europe, although this also marked the elimination from the group stage of both Denmark and Sweden, the latter was a shock one, failed to reach the knockout stage for the first time despite a 2–1 win over North Korea. England reached the quarter-finals, where they lost to the United States 0–3. Norway and Germany subsequently reached the semi-finals where they faced each other, which the Germans won 3–0. Germany was impressive throughout the tournament, topping the group stage undefeated and beating North Korea and Norway with the same scoreline, and finally made history by winning Brazil 2–0 in the final to successfully defend the title. Germany was the first team to win two consecutive World Cup, but moreover, Germany was the first national team in either gender to have won the World Cup without conceding a single goal in process.

2011: Europe getting stunned by Asia
The 2011 qualification saw France's return and Denmark's absent, joining England, Sweden and Norway to the World Cup held in Germany, then-world champions. With the rich European history of participation, Europe was expected to become a dominant force again.

However, once the World Cup started, the tournament became a nightmare for both Norway and hosts Germany, Europe's only world champions. Norway was knocked out of the group stage after suffering shock loss to Australia 1–2 in the final game, a game Norway must win to qualify. For Germany, after winning three consecutive group stage games, Germany met Japan, who was the underdog of the tournament, but Germany could not find the way to break through after 120 minutes; instead, the Germans got a shock punishment in the extra-time by a very disciplined Japanese side, and crashed out of the quarter-finals in the disbelief of home fans. Sweden went to reach the knockout stage as top finisher of its group, beating Australia 3–1 at the quarter-finals but suffered a shock loss in the semi-finals to Japan with the same scoreline. France went on to eliminate England in the last eight on penalty shootout, but losses to the United States and Sweden denied France a top three finish.

2015: Record debutants, but getting sidelined
The 2015 qualification welcomed a historic record as three new European representatives, Spain, Switzerland and the Netherlands, joined the World Cup, alongside Germany, Sweden, Norway, England and France. With eight European sides, Europe was hoping to regain its status after being humiliated by then-world champions Japan four years earlier.

Sweden and Norway had rather unimpressive displays in the competition, more for the former as Sweden only qualified to the round of 16 after three consecutive draws to Nigeria, the United States and Australia, before getting routed by Germany 1–4; Norway did better by finishing second with similar points to Germany (7), but Norway got eliminated by England 1–2. The Netherlands and Switzerland also booked their places in the knockout stage for the first time, finished as two best third-placed team, before went on to be eliminated by Japan and Canada respectively. France reached the quarter-finals of the tournament after topping the group stage (though with an imperfect performance), beating South Korea 3–0 and then lost to Germany on penalty shootout 4–5 after a goalless draw in 120 minutes. England and Germany, meanwhile, became the best-performed teams in that tournament, reaching the semi-finals, but had their journey ended with defeats to Japan and the United States. In the battle for third place, Germany lost to England for the first time ever, with a 0–1 loss in extra time, making England the best-performed team from Europe, which was seen as a revelation after the England men's side failed disastrously in the men's 2014 FIFA World Cup as the worst-performed team from Europe in that edition. Meanwhile, Spain turned out to be the worst-performed team in the Women's World Cup instead, as Spain's debut ended in disaster after getting only just a point against Costa Rica and losses to Brazil and South Korea, despite being highly favoured to progress.

2019: restoration of European domination, but without a title
The 2019 qualification marked historic debut for Scotland while Italy ended its World Cup drought after 20 years. Together, Italy and Scotland joined Germany, Sweden, Norway, England, France, the Netherlands and Spain. France were the hosts of the 2019 edition.

The 2019 edition was significant as for the first time, Europe snatched a football record, with seven teams reaching the last eight. France and Norway dominated group A, overpowered Nigeria and South Korea. Group B also saw Germany and Spain occupied two first places in the group. Italy, meanwhile, stunned Australia and Brazil in its return to occupy top of the group C. Group D also witnessed England seized top of the group, the same also came in group E with the Netherlands did the same. Sweden was the only team from Europe not to top the group (Norway and Spain were drawn with other European opponents), though by finishing second in group F, Sweden also progressed to the last sixteen. All European representatives in the last sixteen, except for Spain, were able to win their respective encounters, making three out of four quarter-finals meetings European affairs. Eventually, England, Sweden and the Netherlands went on to the semi-finals, where the Dutch surprised Sweden with a 1–0 win while England fell to the United States 1–2. Sweden took bronze after beating England 2–1 while the Netherlands, in the historic World Cup final in its just second appearance, were denied of the prize after losing to the defending champions United States 0–2.

Outside of Spain's failure, the other European side, Scotland, left disappointingly, having bravely fought against England and Japan (both lost 1–2), but suffered a shock comeback from three goals lead into a 3–3 draw to minnows Argentina, crashed out of the group stage.

2023
The 2023 qualification, going to be finished in September 2022, will choose out which sides to qualify for the World Cup in Australia and New Zealand. Italy, Norway, Ireland, Spain, England, Sweden, Germany, France, Switzerland, the Netherlands and Denmark have together qualified. However, the qualification was negatively impacted following the 2022 Russian invasion of Ukraine, which saw Russia disqualified from the tournament.

References

External links

 
Association football in Europe
FIFA Women's World Cup records and statistics